Erythrina orientalis is a plant species in the genus Erythrina. This plant is a climbing herb that grows up to 6 m long, and has compound leaves with petioles that are 5–6 cm long. Its leaflets emerge in groups of three, and are 7–9 cm long and 5–8 cm wide. The plant's young leaves, flowers and pods are consumed as vegetables.

The pterocarpan orientanol A can be isolated from the wood of E. orientalis. The pterocarpans orientanol B and C, folitenol and erythrabyssin II, the pterocarpene erycristagallin and the prenylated isoflavone bidwillol A can be isolated from the roots.

References

External links

orientalis